Grunters or tigerperches are ray-finned fishes in the family Terapontidae (also spelled Teraponidae, Theraponidae or Therapontidae). This family is part of the superfamily Percoidea of the order Perciformes.

Characteristics
The Terapontidae is a large family of small to medium-sized perciform fishes which occur in marine, brackish and fresh waters in the Indo-Pacific region. They are characterised by a single long-based dorsal fin which has a notch marking the boundary between the spiny and soft-rayed portions. They have small to moderate-sized scales, a continuous lateral line reaching the caudal fin, and most species lack teeth on the roof of the mouth.  The marine species are found in inshore sea and brackish waters, some species are able to enter extremely saline and fresh waters. In Australia and New Guinea there are a number of species restricted to fresh water.

Classification
The following genera are classified within the family Terpontidae:

 Amniataba Whitley, 1943
 Hannia Vari, 1978
 Helotes Cuvier, 1829
 Hephaestus De Vis, 1884
 Lagusia Vari 1978
 Leiopotherapon Fowler, 1931
 Mesopristes Bleeker, 1873
 Pelates Cuvier, 1829
 Pelsartia Whitley, 1943
 Pingalla Whitley, 1955
 Rhynchopelates Fowler, 1931
 Scortum Whitley, 1943
 Syncomistes Vari, 1978
 Terapon Cuvier, 1816
 Variichthys Allen, 1993

Timeline

References

 
Perciformes families